MDX may refer to:

Computing
 MDX, the 3D graphics file format used by Blizzard Entertainment
 MDX, the default disc image file format of DAEMON Tools
 MDX (markup language), an authorable format for writing JSX in Markdown documents
 Managed DirectX, an API for working with DirectX on Microsoft's .NET platform
 MultiDimensional eXpressions, a query language for OLAP databases
 X68000's MDX, a midi-like format that is designed to be played using the X68000's FM synth

Other
 Acura MDX, a sport utility vehicle introduced by Honda
 Mdx mouse, a popular model for studying Duchenne muscular dystrophy 
 Miami-Dade Expressway Authority, an organization that toll expressways
 Middlesex, county in England, Chapman code
 Middlesex University, which uses the internet domain name mdx.ac.uk
 Mountain Dew MDX, an energy drink